Girls und Panzer is a 2012 Japanese anime television series created by Actas, directed by Tsutomu Mizushima, and produced by Kiyoshi Sugiyama. It depicts a competition between girls' high schools practicing tank warfare as a sport called , the art of operating tanks. The English dub refers to it as "tankery".

Ooarai Girls High School

 is the school ship stationed in Ōarai, Ibaraki that previously had a Sensha-dō program abolished years ago, and has just been recently reinstituted. They are thus forced to make do with whatever leftover tanks they have been able to find, and, unlike the other teams, field a hodgepodge of tanks from various countries. The school insignia is the two kanji for  superimposed atop one another in stylized form.
The school ship of Ōarai Girls High School is based on the IJN Shokaku-class aircraft carrier. They also use a transport ship that looks quite similar to the Japanese battleship Mikasa. All of the protagonists are students from the school and members of its Sensha-dō team while being divided into teams and their own respective tanks.

Anglerfish Team
They were assigned the German Panzer IV Ausf. D, armed with the short-barreled 75mm KwK 37 L/24 gun that is mostly used for infantry support. The tank was later upgraded to a Panzer IV Ausf. F2 when they found a long-barreled 75mm KwK 40 L/43 anti-tank cannon which was being used to hang clothes out to dry. It was upgraded again to Ausf. H, called the "Mk IV Special" in the series, for the Sensha-dō tournament finals match by adding "Schürzen" spaced armour.

The anime's main protagonist, Miho is a girl who comes from a long line of tank operators. Previously she attended Kuromorimine and commanded the flag tank, a Tiger I, in the national championships a year ago against Pravda. However, after she abandoned it to rescue the crew of another tank that had fallen into a river, her tank was knocked out. This ended a nine year winning streak by Kuromorimine and Miho subsequently avoided Sensha-dō and transferred to Ōarai Girls Academy specifically because it did not have Sensha-dō. However, after Sensha-dō is revived by the school, Miho is forced by the student council to take it up again due to her being the only girl in school with actual Sensha-dō experience. She starts to enjoy Sensha-dō after spending time with her new friends. Although shy and reluctant, once she focuses on the battle she shows remarkable talent for keeping her cool, analyzing a battle, and coming up with new strategies on the fly. Originally started as the loader in the anime and later became the tank commander as well as Ōarai's Senshado commander.

A red-haired girl who is interested in seeking out good-looking men, but is often left disappointed. She serves as Anko Team's radio operator, mostly because she is good at small talk. She is also one of the two girls who befriended Miho during her first day. She is the main protagonist of the novel adaptation. In the Das Finale series, she has become the Ōarai's Student Council's new PR Manager.

A beautiful girl who has a gentle and composed demeanor. In the anime was originally the driver but after experiencing the thrilling ring of shots being fired, she becomes Anko Team's gunner. She is also one of the two girls who befriended Miho during her first day. Hana comes from a family which traditionally practices the art of flower arrangement ikebana. In the Das Finale film series, upon the graduation of the old student council, she is elected Student Council President.

An excitable girl who is obsessed with tanks, militaria and military field survival techniques, though this often led her to be very lonely during her childhood. 
Having been inspired by Miho, Yukari joined the Panzer class and became friends with her. Was originally Anko Team's gunner, but later volunteered for the loader position. She admires Miho, and even calls her "Nishizumi-dono". She is the main protagonist of the manga adaptation, where she is the temporary commander of the Char B1. In the Das Finale film series, she has advanced to the rank of Student Council Vice-President.

A gloomy girl and Saori's childhood friend. Despite having extremely good grades, she is always tardy to school as she has low blood pressure and a habit of falling asleep anywhere; for this reason, she hates getting up early. Mako's participation in Sensha-dō is necessary to offset the demerits from her lateness that would otherwise result in her being held back. She serves as Anko Team's driver after joining the team during their first practice battle. Being the smartest student in the class, she is shown to be able to read the manual of any tank on the fly and drive it perfectly.

Turtle Team
The  is made up of the school's student council and uses the Czech Panzer 38(t), until episode 10 of the anime when it is converted into a Hetzer tank destroyer atop the chassis of the 38(t) (using school's donation due to lack of budget to buy a tank). The three girls' given names are the names of fruits in Japanese.

Student Council President and Turtle Team's tank commander/radio operator, who is manipulative, childish, carefree and a glutton all at once. She forced Miho to participate in Sensha-dō, saying that if Miho did not, she would see to it that she would not be attending the school next year. Later, it is revealed that she did this because the school is at risk of being closed should they not win the tournament. She is often seen eating dried sweet potatoes. On occasion, she will take over the gunner's spot in the tank and ends up being a much better shot than Momo.

Student Council PR Manager and the team's gunner/loader whose family runs a stationery store. Although she largely appears composed and calm, she loses her temper easily, and when she is angry and shooting at the same time, she completely disregards aiming. Despite being calm and short tempered, she is sensitive and easily breaks down. She is only seen smiling once in a picture and briefly during the second OVA. In the Das Finale film series, she is made Commander of the Ooarai Senshado team in order to earn a Senshado-based scholarship for entering a university.

Student Council Vice-President and the team's driver. She is a brown-haired, well endowed girl who works mostly in the Student Council, doing all the work Anzu shoves to her.

Duck Team
The  is composed of former volleyball club members and uses the Japanese Type 89B.

The team's tank commander/loader.

The team's radio operator.

The team's driver.

The team's gunner.

Hippo Team
The  is composed of reki-jo (history buffs) and operates a German Sturmgeschütz III Ausf. F.

 

Takako Suzuki is the team's loader and co-commander. Her nickname "Caesar" refers to Julius Caesar, and she favours a red sagum like that of Roman magistrates.
 

Riko Matsumoto, nicknamed "Erwin", is the team's tank commander/radio operator. Her nickname "Erwin" is a reference to Field Marshal Erwin Rommel, and she typically wears a peaked cap and desert tan field jacket.

 

Kiyomi Sugiyama is the team's gunner. Her nickname "Saemonza" refers to Sanada Saemon-no-Suke Yukimura, whose banner (with six golden coins instead of black ones) she habitually wears as a headband. She is often seen with her left eye closed.
 

Takeko Nogami, a bespectacled girl, is the team's driver. Her nickname "Oryō" refers to Narasaki Ryō.

Rabbit Team
The  is composed of six first-year students and uses an American M3 Lee.

The team's tank commander.

The team's driver.

The team's radio operator.

The team's loader and gunner for the tank's hull-mounted 75mm gun.

The team's loader for the tank's turret-mounted 37 mm gun. She never speaks, except for short remarks about certain things of interests.

The team's gunner for the tank's turret-mounted 37mm gun. In the manga, she temporarily took on the role of gunner for the hull-mounted 75mm gun of the Char B1 during Ōarai's match against Anzio.

Mallard Team
The  is composed of the three members of Ōarai's Public Morals Committee (also called Hall Monitors in the English dub) and uses the French Renault Char B1 Bis. In the anime series, they make their debut in the semi-finals against Pravda, while in the manga they join the competition one round earlier, against Anzio.

The team's tank commander and radio operator, as well as the gunner/loader for the tank's turret-mounted 47mm gun. She is often seen taking attendance at the school entrance, and constantly reprimands Mako for showing up late. She becomes irritated whenever she is called by her nickname, .

The team's driver.

The team's gunner/loader for the tank's hull-mounted 75mm gun.

Anteater Team
The  is formed of a group of nerdy girls who often play online tank battle games; they actually meet each other in real life for the first time when they form a team for the Sensha-dō finals. They drive a Japanese Type 3 Chi-Nu medium tank.
 

The team's tank commander and radio operator, who often sports huge swirly glasses and cat ears. She is the one who approaches Miho about joining the Sensha-dō team and inviting her online friends to join them.
 

The team's driver, who wears a peach shaped eyepatch.
 

The team's gunner and loader.

Leopon Team
The  consists of Ōarai's automotive club, who often do repairs on the tanks in between matches. They join the finals match, driving a prototype tank that the Rabbit team found in episode 7. The tank is a Tiger (P), also known as Porsche Tiger, which sports a 88mm KwK L/56 gun. It also has a faulty drive system that has been known to overheat, but its crew makes modifications to the tank in their spare time. The girls' given names are based on famous Japanese racing drivers.

 

The team's tank commander and radio operator, named after Satoru Nakajima, Japan's first full-time Formula One driver.

The team's gunner, named after Kazuyoshi Hoshino, "The fastest man in Japan".

The team's loader, named after Aguri Suzuki, former Formula One driver and currently co-owner of the Amlin Aguri Formula E Team.

The team's driver, named after the legendary "Drift King" Keiichi Tsuchiya.

Shark Team
The  consists of five girls from Bar Donzoko, which is located in the lowest part of Ōarai's ship, a virtual slum region housing the most delinquent members of the Naval Studies Department. The team joins because they owe a favor to Momo Kawashima, who let them stay on the ship despite their escapades and academic failures. Their emblem, as well as most of their clothes and names have a sailor/pirate motif. Their tank is a British Mark IV, the oldest tank ever to operate in the series thus far,  and they join during the events of the Das Finale film series.

The team's tank commander who uses the nickname "Tornado" (竜巻 Tatsumaki).

The team's hard-drinking driver with the nickname "Explosive Cyclone".

The team's brawny and short-tempered starboard gunner and the bar's bouncer, with the nickname "Sargasso" (サルガッソ Sarugasso).

The team's radio operator and co-driver, bearing the nickname "Great Waves". At the Donzoko Bar, she acts as the resident singer.

The team's port gunner, and the Donzoko barkeep. Uses the nickname "Fresh Whitebait Rice Bowl".

Kuromorimine Girls High School
 is a German style academy from Kumamoto Prefecture. It was the national champion nine times running until their defeat the previous year by Pravda. Their tanks include the Tiger I, Tiger II, Panzer III, Jagdpanzer IVs, Panther tanks, Jagdpanther, Elefant, Jagdtiger and Panzer VIII Maus. The school insignia is an Iron Cross with the kanji for  superimposed on top. The school themes include Erika and the Panzerlied. The school ship of Kuromorimine Girls High School is based on the Kriegsmarine aircraft carrier Graf Zeppelin. In the film, they are also shown to have a LZ 127 Graf Zeppelin class airship.

Kuromorimine's commander and Miho's older sister who commands a Tiger I tank. Though often cold and expressionless, she does seem to acknowledge Miho's strength. Since the Nishizumi school is passed from mother to daughter she is expected to inherit the school and carry out the Nishizumi style of Sensha-dō when their mother steps down. It is revealed in "Little Army" that she acts aloof because it is expected of her as the Nishizumi heir, and she plays that role so that Miho can find her own way of Sensha-dō as the Nishizumi style is too cold, strict and unfeeling for her. Despite her facade, Maho apologizes to Miho when she upsets her by acting coldly, and is disturbed by their mother's planning to disown Miho. After her defeat against Miho, Maho accepts her loss and is pleased that Miho has found her own way of Sensha-dō. During Ooarai's game against the University Team, Maho comes to her sister's aid with multiple tanks, exploiting a loophole in the rules to help Miho fight. The two work together to defeat Alice in a tense final battle, securing victory.

Kuromorimine's second-in-command, who criticizes Miho and the Ōarai team more openly and vocally than Maho. She takes Sensha-dō very seriously, viewing it as almost sacred, and looks down on Miho and her friends, believing they might bring shame to the name of Sensha-dō. Following Maho's graduation, she assumes leadership of the Kuromorimine team. Is able to pilot a Fa 223 and formerly commanded a Tiger II tank, now commanding a Panzer III.

A tank commander, whose team was rescued by Miho while she was still attending Kuromorimine, a deed which led to Miho's transfer to Ooarai.

She commands a Jagdpanther.

St. Gloriana Girls Academy
 is a British style academy from Kanagawa Prefecture, where the girls are often seen drinking tea even in combat. They make use of four Matilda II Mk. III/IV tanks and one Churchill Mk. VII tank as their command tank. Images of the school utilizing a Cromwell tank also appear in supplementary materials for the anime. In the film, they also utilize up to four Crusader Mk VI. Their insignia is a shield containing an image of a tea set with Hibiscus syriacus flowers. St. Gloriana faced Ōarai in a practice match prior to the national tournament but was not matched up against them in the latter. They give a tea set as a gift for opponents they deemed worthy. Their battle theme is The British Grenadiers, and the members introduced are named after different types of tea. The school ship of St. Gloriana Girls Academy is based on the Royal Navy aircraft carrier HMS Ark Royal (91).

A senior at St. Gloriana and the commanding officer of St. Gloriana's Sensha-dō teams.  She commands a Churchill tank, and does not believe in using dirty tactics in a match.  She has a distinctively refined manner of speech, is fond of telling jokes and quoting sayings, and is often seen with a cup of tea in her hand.  Following St. Gloriana's match against Ōarai, she comes to respect Miho's tactical skills and becomes a frequent spectator at Ōarai's Sensha-dō matches afterwards.  Her name refers to Darjeeling tea.

A senior at St. Gloriana and the gunner of Darjeeling's tank. Distinctive for her rolling, long locks of blonde hair, she is quiet and is usually seen smiling. Her name refers to Assam tea.

A freshman at St. Gloriana and the loader of Darjeeling's tank. She is often seen in the company of Darjeeling as a spectator at Ōarai's Sensha-dō matches. Her name refers to Orange pekoe.

She commands a Matilda II tank.  Her name refers to Rukuriri tea from Kenya.

A character introduced in the film. She commands a Crusader Mk.III tank. Appears impatient and less refined as compared to her more prim and proper teammates. Her name refers to Rose Hip tea.

Saunders University High School
 is an American style academy from Nagasaki Prefecture. Out of all the Sensha-dō schools they have the most resources and a huge supply of tanks. They own numerous M4 Sherman tanks, including variants such as the Sherman Firefly and the M4A6 Sherman. They also own a C-5 Galaxy transport aircraft. Their battle themes are The Battle Hymn of the Republic and the US Field Artillery. Their insignia is a lightning bolt and five-pointed star atop a shield. The school ship of Saunders University High School is based on the US Navy Nimitz-class aircraft carrier as an homage to the USS George Washington (CVN-73), the US Navy carrier deployed in Japan at the time.

The energetic commander of the Saunders Sensha-dō team, portrayed as a stereotypical American, who is loud, boisterous, charismatic, and laid back. She believes that Sensha-dō is not war and believes in fair play.

One of the Saunders Sensha-dō sub-commanders and a Sherman Firefly gunner, specialized in distance shooting. She is calm and cool, often seen chewing gum while sniping her targets.

A manipulative sub-commander of the Saunders Sensha-dō team, who uses every advantage she can get to win, including wire-tapping radio communications by her adversaries, which backfires during the match against Ōarai in the first round of the national championship when they realize her trick. In the occasion, she commanded the flag tank.

Pravda High School
 is a Russian style academy from Aomori Prefecture and the current Sensha-dō champions. The name Pravda (Cyrillic: Правда) literally translates as "truth" in Russian, and refers to the Soviet newspaper Pravda. Their insignia consists of two overlapping steel squares crossed with a T-square and small scissors on top, imitating the hammer and sickle design of the flag of the Soviet Union. A red four-pointed star on their uniform is an imitation of the Red Army five-pointed star. Their battle songs are Polyushko-polye and Katyusha. They make use of several T-34/76 and T-34/85 medium tanks, but also use heavy tanks like the IS-2 and KV-2. They have a Katyusha rocket launcher, although it is not used during battle.  The school ship of Pravda High School is based on the Kiev-class aircraft carrier. They also own a Zubr-class LCAC, as shown in the film.

Pravda's commander. Katyusha is a spoiled and arrogant girl who suffers from Napoleon complex due to her diminutive size and thus tends to look down on her opponents, often having Nonna give her a ride on her shoulders so she can be above others. However, she is also a capable strategist and charismatic leader, proven by her school's successes during Sensha-dō and the absolute loyalty of her comrades. Despite appearing as mean and aggressive, she still shows good sportsmanship, as seen when she shakes hands with and compliments Miho.

Pravda's second-in-command who has a calm and cool demeanor, hardly showcasing any emotions and follows every order of Katyusha. She and her commander also share a deep bond, as Nonna acts very motherly toward Katyusha and can even correct her without being yelled at much. In tankery, Nonna is a very accurate sniper who hardly ever misses. She speaks fluent Russian and habitually communicates with Klara in Russian, which prompts a scolding from Katyusha. (Sumire Uesaka, the voice actress who played Nonna in the Japanese version, majored in Russian language.)

A character introduced in the OVA "Snow War!". She is a loader of Pravda's  KV-2.

A loader of Pravda's KV-2 introduced in the OVA "Snow War!".

A character introduced in the 2015 film. Although she can speak fluent Japanese, she prefers to converse in Russian, much to the chagrin of Katyusha, who has not learned that language.

Anzio High School
 is an Italian style private academy (founded to promote Italian culture in Japan) from Aichi Prefecture which uses the Carro Armato P40, L3/33, Semovente 75/18, and Fiat M13/40. The school insignia is a pizza. It is named after the Battle of Anzio. Their battle songs are Funiculì, Funiculà, a popular Neapolitan song, and Fiamme Nere (Black Flames), Arditi's battle march.  The school ship of Anzio High School is based on the Italian aircraft carrier Aquila.

"Duce" Anchovy is Anzio's commander, who uses a Carro Armato P 40 heavy tank. She wears a hybrid uniform combining Black Shirts' (high boots, black shirt), similar to that of Benito Mussolini, the grigio-verde (grey and green), used by Italian troops during the Great War, and Arditi's (knife and necktie).
Anchovy's personality differs widely between the manga and anime (OVA). In the manga, she is a self-confident, hot-blooded, sometimes even cruel leader, seeing every Sensha-dō battle as personal duel between the leaders. Due to this attitude she even tends to insult enemies before the match, calling them weak and cowardly, and outright accusing Miho of throwing away victory during the last tournament.
In the anime she instead resembles all the classical stereotypes about the Italians: she is joyful, cheerful, a bit too self-confident, and out of the battle she acts friendly and respectfully with the opponents. She takes Sensha-dō as an opportunity to show that her team's abilities extend beyond their fighting spirit and determination; for this, she is greatly respected and admired by her subordinates, with whom she has an equal relationship, even to the point of their calling her . She is shown to be quite caring towards her teammates as well as a capable tactician, and believes leaders have a responsibility to win the match for their team.

One of Anzio's vice-commanders, whose real name is Hina. She is a calm and collected individual and an honorable opponent, always wishing for a good and fair match. She is the loader-radio operator of a Semovente 75/18 in the OVA, and commander of the M13 Flag Tank in manga. She is childhood friends with Caesar.

The second of Anzio's vice-commanders. She drives an L3/33; while smart and extroverted, she can be a bit impulsive and often acts without thinking things through. She is also a great cook, as shown when she is running a booth serving Anzio's famous Napolitan dish.

Chi-Ha-Tan Academy
 is a school from Chiba Prefecture which is based on the Imperial Japanese Army. Their tanks include Type 97 Chi-Ha, Type 97 ShinHoTo Chi-Ha, and the Type 2 Ka-Mi amphibious tank. Their school tradition's strategy is to charge into battle, often resulting in big losses. Their battle theme is Yuki no Shingun. Although not seen in the film, their school carrier is based on the Japanese aircraft carrier Akagi in her old triple flight deck configuration.

The commander of Chihatan Academy's Senshado Team. A respectable leader who upholds honour and tradition. Sometimes has difficulty controlling the team's eagerness to charge towards the enemy. She rides a Type 97 Chi-Ha tank.

A bespectacled junior member commanding a Type 95 Ha-Go. Initially eager to follow her seniors' example by charging towards the enemy, she eventually bonds with the Duck Team and learns to emulate Oarai team's tactics.

She commands a Type 97 ShinHoTo Chi-Ha tank.

She commands a Type 97 Chi-Ha tank.

She commands a Type 97 Chi-Ha tank.

She commands a Type 97 ShinHoTo Chi-Ha tank.

Hosomi's tank radio operator.

She commands a Type 97 ShinHoTo Chi-Ha tank.

She commands a Type 97 Chi-Ha tank.

She commands a Type 2 Ka-Mi.

Fukuda's tank driver.

Fukuda's tank gunner. 

She commands a Type 2 Ka-Mi.

Jatkosota (Keizoku) High school
 is a Finnish style school from Ishikawa Prefecture that appears in the film. The name "Keizoku" means "Continuation" in Japanese and is a reference to the Continuation War. Their names are all distinctly male Finnish common first names; their battle theme is the Säkkijärven polkka, and their one-tank team consists of a BT-42. From Das Finale Part 3 the team fields a number of T-26 tanks.

The commander, tank commander and radio operator of the Keizoku team, Mika is a somewhat philosophical girl who is always carrying a kantele and a Finnish sauna hat. Behind her serene facade, however, Mika is a mischievous person who does not hesitate to stealthily appropriate supplies and materials from her opponents.

The gunner and loader of Mika's team, and (like Orange Pekoe to Darjeeling) her constant sidekick.

The driver of Mika's team with a set of outrageous driving skills.

Nicknamed "White Witch", in reference to Simo Häyhä.

BC Freedom Academy
 is a French style high school from Okayama Prefecture. The student body is divided into two parties, the enlisted students ("Escalators") and the transfer students ("Examinators"), which are quarreling with each other. In the series, the academy sports several themes from the French Revolution and Napoleonic eras, including the contemporary military march Chanson de l'Oignon ("Song of the Onion") as their Senshado battle theme.

Anime
Their tanks include ARL 44, SOMUA S35 and Renault FT17.

The commander of BC Freedom Academy's Senshado Team who rides a Renault FT17 and enjoys eating cake at all times, as a nod to the French queen Marie Antoinette. She is an extremely cunning tactician; before her Shenshado match against Ooarai she manages to quell the infighting between the Escalators and Examinators, which almost proves fatal to the Ooarai team.

The leader of the BC Examination Senshado members who commands a SOMUA S35 tank.

The leader of the BC Escalator Shenshado members, and commander of an ARL 44 tank.

Manga

Bonple High School
 is a Polish style high school based in Fukui Prefecture. The academy sports themes are mostly based from Polish national folk songs and inspired from the Home Army and the Solidarity movement, where the name of the school derived from. The school's emblem resembles from Wojtek, a World War II's bear serving for the Polish Armed Forces in the West and their Senshado team fields the FT-17, TKS and the 7TP.

Anime

The overall commander of Bonple High School.

Manga

Pierogi

Blue Division High School
 is a Spanish style high school based in Wakayama Prefecture. The school is famous for its culinary and do not have an official Senshado club. Their schoolgirl uniforms based on those of the real-life Blue Division, which are known for their deep cleavage. The team used to have only light tanks such as the Verdeja 1, Panzer I, Panzer II and Carro Veloce CV.35, complemented by comparatively heavier light tanks such as BT-5 and T-26 until acquiring heavier models such as the Panzer IV Ausf.H, various Panzer III models and several StuG III.

The overall commander of Blue Division High School whose tank is a Panzer II Ausf.F.

The driver of El's tank.

The radio operator of El's tank.

She commands a Panzer II Ausf. F.

Koala Forest High School
 is an Australian style high school based in Tottori Prefecture. The school is famous for its barbecue parties and is friendly towards other schools, specially with Saunders and St. Gloriana. They have a koala in their main tank whom they appointed as their overall commander. Their tanks include the Matilda II, the M3 Light and Medium Tanks, and various other vehicles such as the Australian AC.I Sentinel and the very rare AC.III Thunderbolt.

The vice-commander of Koala Forest High School and the de facto commander who claims to only follow koala's orders.

The gunner of koala and Wallaby's tank.

Maginot Girls Academy
Maginot Girls Academy(マジノ女学院, Mazino Jogakuin) is a French style academy from Yamanashi Prefecture which uses the SOMUA S35, Renault R35,Renault Char B1 Bis and Renault FT17. The school ship of Maginot Girls Academy is based on the French submarine Surcouf. 

Commander

University Strengthened Team
 is a selection of college students that confronts Ōarai in the film. Their insignia is inspired by the Flag of the United Nations. Like Ōarai, they use tanks from multiple countries, including American, British, and German models. These include M26 Pershing, Centurion A41, M24 Chaffee, a T28 Super Heavy Tank, and a Karl Gerat. They are also shown in the film to have several white M4 Sherman, though they were not used in the match. Their battle theme is When Johnny Comes Marching Home.

University Strengthened Team's overall commander, and the heir to the Shimada Sensha-dō school. A highly intelligent prodigy, she overshot several classes in school and is now attending university despite her still-tender age. Like Miho, she is an avid fan and collector of the Boko franchise (see below). During her match against Ōarai, she rides a Centurion A41. After the match, Alice decides to leave the university and attend classes in a high school so that she can enjoy her youth. Considering to enroll in Ōarai at first, she decides to look for another school so that she can face Miho in battle again.

Megumi is one of Alice's three lieutenants and part of the Bermuda Trio. Before attending University she was a member of Saunders Girls High School. She commands an M26 Pershing, identifiable by a red square on the mudflap.

Azumi is one of Alice's three lieutenants and part of the Bermuda Trio. Before attending University she was a member of BC Freedom High School. She commands an M26 Pershing, identifiable by a yellow diamond on the mudflap.

Rumi is one of Alice's three lieutenants and part of the Bermuda Trio. Before attending University she was a member of Jatkosota High School. She commands an M26 Pershing, identifiable by a blue triangle on the mudflap.

Japan's Senshado Federation

Chief director

The head umpire

Sub-umpire

Sub-umpire

Others

Ōarai's new Sensha-dō instructor who studied under Miho's mother. Holds the rank of captain within the JGSDF. On her first day as instructor, she arrived at Ōarai by airdropping in her tank via Low Altitude Parachute Extraction System from a Kawasaki C-2 and sending the inexperienced teams into an all-out practice battle immediately. She is often either on her Type 10 Main Battle Tank or on a watch tower observing the Ōarai team's battles.

Hana's mother who comes from a family that traditionally practices flower arrangement. Akin to a traditional Japanese woman, she has a strong dislike for tanks and disapproves of Hana doing Sensha-dō, telling her daughter to never see her again after Hana refused to quit. However, they reconcile when she recognizes her daughter's passion for Sensha-dō and its positive effect on her flower arranging.

Rickshaw puller and manservant for the Isuzu family, who adores and encourages Hana.

Yukari's father. He is a local barber who tends to be a little over-excitable about his daughter's welfare.

Yukari's mother. She helps her husband at the barber shop, and tries her best to temper his emotional outbursts.

Miho and Maho's mother. Comes from a family with a long history in Sensha-dō and firmly believes in upholding the strict family tradition of Sensha-dō. She was Ami Chōno's instructor.

Mako's grandmother who was hospitalized during the battle between Ōarai and Saunders in the national Sensha-dō championship. She is Mako's only remaining family after her parents died, and although the two often bicker, they are very close.

Alice Shimada's mother. Head of the Shimada style of Sensha-dō. She is a rival to Nishizumi style's head, Shiho Nishizumi. 

Miho's classmate during elementary school in the prequel manga, Girls und Panzer: Little Army. A half-German, half-Japanese girl in twin-tails who has a cold demeanour and hates dishonesty. She strongly dislikes Maho because of her order to fire at her sister's tank during a tournament when she was attempting to rescue one of Maho's teammates. She is the driver of the group's tank.

Miho's classmate in elementary school, who's a bit clumsy and tends to transition from one hobby to another very quickly, causing her friends to wonder if Sensha-dō is merely a phase. She is the loader of the group's tank.

Miho's classmate in elementary school and Hitomi's childhood friend, who is talented at sports. She indicates that her mother, like Miho's, is very strict and impossible to oppose. She is the gunner of the group's tank.

Boko is the name of a fictional teddy bear franchise in Girls und Panzer. Appearing in various cameos in the TV series, it receives a more detailed introduction in the 2015 movie. Boko performs the part of a much-abused yet ever-optimistic victim of vicious beatings; hence he always sports some form of lesions and bandaging in his various depictions. Because of his long-suffering but enduring nature, he has become an idol and coveted collector's item for both Miho and Alice.

References

External links
  

Girls und Panzer